Ethel Ruby Keeler (August 25, 1909 – February 28, 1993) was an American actress, dancer, and singer who was paired on-screen with Dick Powell in a string of successful early musicals at Warner Bros., particularly 42nd Street (1933). From 1928 to 1940, she was married to actor and singer Al Jolson. She retired from show business in the 1940s, but made a widely publicized comeback on Broadway in 1971.

Early life
Keeler was born in Dartmouth, Nova Scotia, Canada, in 1909 to Ralph Hector and Nellie (née Lahey) Keeler, one of six siblings in an Irish Catholic family. Two sisters, Helen and Gertrude, had brief performing careers. Her father was a truck driver. When Ruby was three years old, her family moved to New York City, where her father could get better pay. Although Keeler was interested in taking dance lessons, the family could not afford to send her.

Keeler attended St. Catherine of Siena on New York's East Side, and one period each week, a dance teacher taught all styles of dance. The teacher saw potential in Keeler and spoke to her mother about Ruby's taking lessons at her studio. Though her mother declined, apologizing for the lack of money, the teacher wanted to work with her so badly that she asked her mother if she would bring her to class lessons on Saturdays, and she agreed.

During the classes, a girl told her about auditions for chorus girls. The law required professional chorus girls to be at least 16 years old; although they were only 13, they decided to lie about their ages at the audition. It was a tap audition, and many other talented girls were there. The stage was covered except for a wooden apron at the front. When it was Ruby's turn to dance, she asked the dance director, Julian Mitchell, if she could dance on the wooden part so that her taps could be heard. He did not answer, so she went ahead, walked up to the front of the stage, and started her routine. The director said "Who said you could dance up there?" She replied "I asked you!", and she got a job in George M. Cohan's The Rise of Rosie O'Reilly (1923), in which she made $45 per week.

Early dance career

Around 1923, when she was around 14 years old, she was hired by Nils Granlund, the publicity manager for Loews Theaters, who also served as the stage-show producer for Texas Guinan at Larry Fay's El Fay nightclub, a speakeasy frequented by gangsters. She was noticed by Broadway producer Charles B. Dillingham, who gave her a role in Bye, Bye, Bonnie (produced by L. Lawrence Weber), which ran for six months. She then appeared in Lucky and as Mamie in The Sidewalks of New York, also produced by Dillingham. In the later show, she was seen by Flo Ziegfeld, who sent her a bunch of roses and a note that stated, "May I make you a star?"

She appeared in Ziegfeld's Whoopee! (before being replaced before the opening by Ethel Shutta) in 1928, the same year she married Al Jolson. The two met in Los Angeles (not at Texas Guinan's as he would claim), where Granlund had sent her to assist in the marketing campaign for The Jazz Singer. Jolson was smitten and immediately proposed. The couple married September 21, 1928, in Port Chester, New York, in a private ceremony. The two sailed the following morning for a brief honeymoon before she began her tour with Whoopee! She was 19 years old, and he was around 42.

In 1933, producer Darryl F. Zanuck cast Keeler in the Warner Bros. musical 42nd Street opposite Dick Powell and Bebe Daniels. The film was a huge success due to Busby Berkeley's lavish, innovative choreography. Following 42nd Street, Jack L. Warner gave Keeler a long-term contract and cast her in Gold Diggers of 1933, Footlight Parade, Dames, and Colleen. Keeler and Jolson starred together in Go into Your Dance, which was their only film together. They are satirized in Frank Tashlin's 1937 cartoon The Woods Are Full of Cuckoos. Jolson and Keeler appeared on Broadway one last time together for the unsuccessful show Hold on to Your Hats.

Later life
In 1963, Keeler appeared in The Greatest Show on Earth, Jack Palance's television series based on the earlier Charlton Heston circus film of the same name, and made a brief cameo in the 1970 film The Phynx. In 1971, Keeler was acclaimed as a star again in the successful Broadway revival of the 1920s musical No, No, Nanette, opposite Jack Gilford, Bobby Van, Helen Gallagher, and Patsy Kelly. The production was supervised by Keeler's 42nd Street director Busby Berkeley, adapted and directed by Burt Shevelove, and choreographed by Donald Saddler, who won the Tony Award for his musical staging. Keeler starred in the musical for two seasons on Broadway, followed by two additional years touring in the show. After suffering a brain aneurysm in 1974, she became spokeswoman for the National Stroke Association.

Honors
In 1992, a Golden Palm Star on the Palm Springs Walk of Stars was dedicated to her. She has a star on the Hollywood Walk of Fame at 6730 Hollywood Blvd. In 1979, she was awarded an honorary doctor of humane letters degree by St. Bonaventure University.

Personal life
Keeler and Jolson adopted a son, but later divorced in 1940. In 1941, she married John Homer Lowe, a businessman, and left show business the same year. Keeler and Lowe had four children. Lowe died in 1969.

Keeler had two nephews who also worked in the film business. Joey D. Vieira, also known as Donald Keeler, is best remembered for portraying Sylvester "Porky" Brockway on TV's Lassie (retitled Jeff's Collie in syndicated reruns and on DVD) from 1954 to 1957. Vieira's brother, Ken Weatherwax, played Pugsley Addams on the 1960s TV series The Addams Family. Ruby's son John Lowe had a career as a Broadway stage manager for a number of productions beginning with No, No, Nanette in 1970.

Keeler was a Catholic. She was also a Republican who supported Dwight Eisenhower's campaign during the 1952 presidential election.

Death
Keeler died of kidney cancer on February 28, 1993, in Rancho Mirage, California, aged 83.

Filmography

Features

Short subjects
 Ruby Keeler (1929)
 Screen Snapshots Series 9, No. 20 (1930)
 And She Learned About Dames (1934)
 Screen Snapshots Series 16, No. 7 (1937)
 A Day at Santa Anita (1937)
 Hollywood Handicap (1938)
 Screen Snapshots: Hollywood Recreation (1940)

Stage work
 The Rise of Rosie O'Reilly (1923)
 Bye, Bye, Bonnie (1927)
 Lucky (1927)
 Sidewalks of New York (1927)
 Whoopee! (1928) (replaced by Ethel Shutta before opening)
 Show Girl (1929)
 Hold on to Your Hats (1940) (replaced by Eunice Healey before opening)
 No, No, Nanette (1971)

References

External links

 
 
 
 
 Ruby Keeler profile, virtual-history.com; accessed September 19, 2014.

1909 births
1993 deaths
20th-century American actresses
20th-century American singers
20th-century American women singers
20th-century Canadian actresses
20th-century Canadian women singers
Actresses from Halifax, Nova Scotia
Actresses from New York City
American female dancers
American film actresses
American musical theatre actresses
American people of Irish descent
American Roman Catholics
American stage actresses
American tap dancers
California Republicans
Canadian emigrants to the United States
Canadian expatriate actresses in the United States
Canadian female dancers
Canadian film actresses
Canadian musical theatre actresses
Canadian people of Irish descent
Canadian Roman Catholics
Canadian stage actresses
Catholics from New York (state)
Dancers from New York (state)
Deaths from cancer in California
Deaths from kidney cancer
Musicians from Halifax, Nova Scotia
New York (state) Republicans
People from Dartmouth, Nova Scotia
Singers from New York City
Warner Bros. contract players